Cariblatta is a genus of cockroach in the family Ectobiidae. There are more than 70 described species in Cariblatta.

Species
These 77 species belong to the genus Cariblatta:

 Cariblatta acreana Lopes & Oliveira, 2004
 Cariblatta advena Rehn, 1932
 Cariblatta aediculata Hebard, 1916
 Cariblatta alvarengai Lopes & Garcia, 2009
 Cariblatta antiguensis (Saussure & Zehntner, 1893)
 Cariblatta baiana Rocha e Silva, 1973
 Cariblatta binodosa Rocha e Silva, 1973
 Cariblatta bistylata Rocha e Silva & Lopes, 1975
 Cariblatta bodoqueniana Lopes & Garcia, 2009
 Cariblatta cacauensis Rocha e Silva & Lopes, 1975
 Cariblatta carioca Rocha e Silva & Lopes, 1975
 Cariblatta craticula Hebard, 1916
 Cariblatta cruenta Rocha e Silva & Lopes, 1977
 Cariblatta cryptobia Rehn & Hebard, 1927
 Cariblatta cuprea Hebard, 1916
 Cariblatta delicatula (Guérin-Méneville, 1857)
 Cariblatta duckeniana Lopes, Oliveira & Tarli, 2014
 Cariblatta elongata Rocha e Silva & Lopes, 1976
 Cariblatta exquisita Rocha e Silva & Lopes, 1975
 Cariblatta faticana Rehn, 1930
 Cariblatta fossicauda Hebard, 1916
 Cariblatta glochis Rehn & Hebard, 1927
 Cariblatta guadeloupensis Bonfils, 1969
 Cariblatta hebardi Rehn, 1945
 Cariblatta hylaea Rehn, 1945
 Cariblatta icarus Rehn, 1945
 Cariblatta igarapensis Rehn, 1918
 Cariblatta imitans Hebard, 1916
 Cariblatta imitatrix Rocha e Silva & Lopes, 1975
 Cariblatta inexpectata Rocha e Silva, 1973
 Cariblatta insignis Rocha e Silva, 1974
 Cariblatta insularis (Walker, 1868)
 Cariblatta invaginata Lopes & Garcia, 2009
 Cariblatta islacolonis Rehn & Hebard, 1927
 Cariblatta itapetinguensis Rocha e Silva, 1973
 Cariblatta jamaicensis Rehn & Hebard, 1927
 Cariblatta landalei Rehn & Hebard, 1927
 Cariblatta leucops Rehn & Hebard, 1927
 Cariblatta lutea (Saussure & Zehntner, 1893) (small yellow cockroach)
 Cariblatta magnifica Lopes & Oliveira, 2002
 Cariblatta manauensis Lopes, Oliveira & Tarli, 2014
 Cariblatta matogrossensis Rocha e Silva & Lopes, 1975
 Cariblatta mesembrina Hebard, 1921
 Cariblatta mineira (Rocha e Silva, 1955)
 Cariblatta minima Hebard, 1916 (least yellow cockroach)
 Cariblatta minustylata Lopes & Garcia, 2009
 Cariblatta mosela Rocha e Silva & Vasconcellos, 1987
 Cariblatta nebulicola Rehn & Hebard, 1927
 Cariblatta neocacauensis Rocha e Silva & Lopes, 1975
 Cariblatta neopunctipennis Rocha e Silva & Lopes, 1975
 Cariblatta nigra Rocha e Silva & Lopes, 1975
 Cariblatta orestera Rehn & Hebard, 1927
 Cariblatta pernambucana Rocha e Silva, 1974
 Cariblatta personata Rehn, 1916
 Cariblatta picturata Rehn & Hebard, 1927
 Cariblatta plagia Rehn & Hebard, 1927
 Cariblatta prima Rocha e Silva & Lopes, 1975
 Cariblatta punctipennis Hebard, 1916
 Cariblatta reticulosa (Walker, 1868)
 Cariblatta rustica Rocha e Silva, 1973
 Cariblatta seabrai Rocha e Silva & Lopes, 1975
 Cariblatta silvicola Rocha e Silva & Lopes, 1977
 Cariblatta sooretamensis (Rocha e Silva, 1963)
 Cariblatta spinicauda Hebard, 1929
 Cariblatta spinifera Lopes & Garcia, 2009
 Cariblatta spinostylata Lopes & Oliveira, 2002
 Cariblatta stenophrys Rehn & Hebard, 1927
 Cariblatta tetrastylata Lopes & Garcia, 2009
 Cariblatta tobagensis Hebard, 1929
 Cariblatta unguiculata Rehn & Hebard, 1927
 Cariblatta ungulata Rocha e Silva & Lopes, 1975
 Cariblatta unica Rocha e Silva & Lopes, 1975
 Cariblatta unystilata Lopes & Oliveira, 2004
 Cariblatta varia Rocha e Silva & Lopes, 1975
 Cariblatta venezuelana Princis, 1951
 Cariblatta vera Rocha e Silva & Lopes, 1975
 Cariblatta virgulina Rocha e Silva & Lopes, 1975

References

Cockroaches
Articles created by Qbugbot